In mathematics, Beez's theorem, introduced by Richard Beez in 1875, implies that if n > 3 then in general an (n – 1)-dimensional hypersurface immersed in Rn cannot be deformed.

References

 

Theorems in differential geometry